Gynacantha villosa is a species of dragonfly in the family Aeshnidae. It is found in Botswana, Burundi, Central African Republic, the Democratic Republic of the Congo, Ethiopia, Kenya, Malawi, Mozambique, South Africa, Tanzania, Uganda, Zambia, and possibly Burkina Faso. Its natural habitats are subtropical or tropical moist lowland forests and shrub-dominated wetlands.

References

Aeshnidae
Insects described in 1902
Taxonomy articles created by Polbot